St Cadoc's or St Cadocs or St Catwg's may refer to:

Churches
St Cadoc's Church, Caerleon, Newport
St Cadoc's Church, Cheriton, Gower, Swansea
St Catwg's Church, Cwmcarvan, Monmouthshire
St Cadoc's Church, Glynneath, Neath Port Talbot
St Catwg's Church, Gelligaer, Caerphilly
St Cadoc's Church, Llancarfan, Vale of Glamorgan
St Cadoc's Church, Llangattock-juxta-Usk, Monmouthshire
St Cadoc's Church, Llangattock Lingoed, Monmouthshire
St Cadoc's Church, Llangattock Vibon Avel, Monmouthshire
St Cadoc's Church, Pendoylan, Vale of Glamorgan 
St Cadoc's Church, Penrhos, Monmouthshire
St Cadoc's Church, Raglan, Monmouthshire

Other uses
St Cadoc's Hospital, in Caerleon, Newport, Wales
St Cadocs/Penygarn, an electoral ward in the county borough of Torfaen, Wales
St Cadoc's Y.C., a Scottish football club 
 St Cadoc, Halfway, a parish in the Roman Catholic Diocese of Motherwell, Scotland

See also
Cadoc